Atbasar (Atbasar) is a town in Aqmola Region of the northern Kazakhstan. It was founded in 1845. Atbasar is the 44th biggest city in Kazakhstan. Atbasar lies at an altitude of 282 meters above sea level. Population:

Climate 
<div style="width:75%">

Heavy rains in April 2017 caused a dam to rupture, leaving the whole town under water.

How to get to Atbasar
The capital, Nur-Sultan is 3.5 hours away by train. A narrow-gauge railway line running TU2 diesel locomotives provides local freight transport.

Atbasar also has a small airport.

Environment
Concern has been raised by the United Nations Economic Commission for Europe about exposure of the city to airborne uranium ore dust produced during the transfer of the ore from between railway flatcars.

References

External links
 Panoramio — Photo of Панорама Атбасара

Populated places in Akmola Region
Akmolinsk Oblast (Russian Empire)
Populated places established in 1845